Maximilian Solomon Dietz (born February 9, 2002) is an American professional soccer player who plays as a midfielder for Greuther Fürth II.

Career statistics

Club

Notes

References

2002 births
Living people
Soccer players from New York City
American soccer players
United States men's youth international soccer players
American people of German descent
Citizens of Germany through descent
German footballers
Association football midfielders
3. Liga players
Eintracht Frankfurt players
FSV Frankfurt players
SC Freiburg players
SC Freiburg II players
SpVgg Greuther Fürth II players